is a train station in Katsuragi, Nara Prefecture, Japan.

Lines
Kintetsu Railway
Gose Line

Platforms and tracks 
The station has one  platforms and one track.

Adjacent stations

Railway stations in Japan opened in 1930
Railway stations in Nara Prefecture